The forest pipistrelle (Pipistrellus adamsi) is a species of vesper bat found in Australia, in the northernmost parts of Queensland and the Northern Territory.

References

Mammals described in 1986
Bats of Australia
Mammals of the Northern Territory
Mammals of Queensland
Pipistrellus
Taxa named by Darrell Kitchener
Taxonomy articles created by Polbot